Dan Neville (born 18 November 1978) is an English football manager and former manager of the British Virgin Islands.

Coaching career
Originally from Bournemouth, Neville began his coaching career in the academy at hometown club AFC Bournemouth. In March 2021, Neville took over from John Reilly to manage the British Virgin Islands' 2022 World Cup qualification ties against Guatemala and Saint Vincent and the Grenadines.

Managerial statistics

References

1978 births
Living people
Sportspeople from Bournemouth
English football managers
Association football coaches
AFC Bournemouth non-playing staff
British Virgin Islands national football team managers